Matters Of The Heart is a novel by Danielle Steel, published by Delacorte Press in June 2009. The book is Steel's seventy-eighth novel.

Synopsis
Hope Dunne lives in a chic SoHo loft, content with her life as a top photographer. So when she accepts a London assignment at Christmas to photograph a world-famous writer, she never expected to fall in love. Finn O’Neill is taken aback with Hope and they have a windswept romance with Finn whisking her away to his palatial, Irish estate. Though divorced, Hope loves her ex-husband Paul very much. Paul, a retired surgeon, divorced her only because he didn't want to pull her along with him as he dies slowly from illness.

Hope begins to fall in love but soon finds that Finn and his life are not what she expects. Hope is madly in love with Finn but he is also the source of her fears. Finn' lies and hurt begin to unnerve Hope and she becomes scared and alone miles away from home with no-one to support her as she tries to deal with all matters of the heart.

Finn O’Neill exudes warmth and a boyish charm. Enormously successful, he is a perfect counterpoint to Hope’s quiet, steady grace–and he’s taken instantly by her. He courts her as no one ever has before, whisking her away to his palatial, isolated Irish estate.

Hope finds it all, and him, irresistible. But soon cracks begin to appear in his stories: Gaps in his history, a few innocent lies, and bouts of jealousy unnerve her. Suddenly Hope is both in love and deeply in doubt, and ultimately frightened of the man she loves. Is it possible that this adoring man is hiding something even worse? The spell cast by a brilliant sociopath has her trapped in his web, too confused and dazzled to escape, as he continues to tighten his grip on her.

Footnotes
http://www.randomhouse.com/features/steel/bookshelf/display.pperl?isbn=9780385340274

2009 American novels
American romance novels

Novels by Danielle Steel
Delacorte Press books